The Great Western Railway 3700 Class, or City Class, locomotives were a series of twenty 4-4-0 steam locomotives, designed for hauling express passenger trains.

Construction
In September 1902 a member of the Atbara Class, no. 3405 Mauritius, was reboilered with a tapered domeless boiler and Belpaire firebox. The locomotive was the first GWR 4-4-0 to be fitted with a tapered boiler; the boiler became the prototype for Churchward's Standard No. 4 boiler. In March 1903 the first of the City Class, no. 3433 City of Bath, was completed. It was fitted with the final form of the Standard No.4 boiler, with slightly curved sides and a tapered top to the firebox. Another nine locomotives were completed in May 1903. Between February 1907 and December 1908, nine Atbaras were rebuilt with this boiler and incorporated into the City Class. All members of the class were withdrawn between October 1927 and May 1931.

Details

Modifications
Superheating of the boiler was first applied to no. 3702, Halifax in June 1910. All of the class had been fitted with superheaters by 1912. Boiler feed was originally by clack valves fitted to the underside of the barrel. Top feed was introduced in 1912 and new cast iron chimneys in 1921. The slide valves were replaced by  semi-plug piston valves from 1914. All the engines were fitted with steam reversing gear but only a few, including no. 3716 City of London, had the gear replaced by the screw reverse. The Dean suspension bogie was replaced by a bogie developed from the type used on the de Glehn Atlantics.

Accidents and incidents
On 8 August 1913, locomotive No. 3710 City of Bath overran signals and was in a rear-end collision with a passenger train at  station, Somerset. Two people were killed.

City of Truro

The most famous locomotive in the class, 3440 City of Truro (later renumbered 3717), is reputedly the first steam locomotive to travel in excess of 100 mph, on 9 May 1904. It was the 2000th locomotive to be built at Swindon, leaving the works in April 1903.

Withdrawal
Withdrawal of the class began in 1927 with 3718 City of Winchester which was withdrawn in October 1927, the engines working life being only just over 24 years. Regular withdrawal of the class began in August of the following year and by July 1930 only two engines were left in service on the GWR, these being 3712 City of Bristol and 3717 City of Truro. 3717 was the first of the final two engines to be withdrawn as it was withdrawn in March 1931 & 3712 followed two months later in May of the same year.

Only one member of the class has survived into preservation, this being 3440/3717 City of Truro.

Preservation
Historically significant because of its famed 1904 run, City of Truro was a prime candidate for preservation, whereas the rest of the class were scrapped. It is owned by the National Railway Museum, York. It was last restored to full working order in 2004 and, as of 2009, is frequently loaned for operation on UK main lines and heritage railways. As of 2021, 'City of Truro' is on static display.

List of Locomotives
This class were subject to the 1912 renumbering of GWR 4-4-0 locomotives, which saw the Bulldog class gathered together in the series 3300–3455, and other types renumbered out of that series. The City Class took numbers 3700–3719, previously used by Bulldog locomotives.

Models
Bachmann Branchline manufacture a model of City of Truro in OO gauge for sale through the National Railway Museum.  
In December 2014 Bachmann Branchline launched a commemorative World War I Ambulance Train pack. The train pack contains a model of 3711 City of Birmingham in World War I khaki livery, three Midland coaches in crimson lake and six World War I figures.

In the early 1960s there was a Kitmaster OO scale (1:76) plastic construction kit to build a model of 3440 City of Truro, which was later produced by Airfix and now DAPOL.

References 

Notes

Bibliography

3700
4-4-0 locomotives
Railway locomotives introduced in 1902
Standard gauge steam locomotives of Great Britain
Passenger locomotives